Doris Jones may refer to:

Doris Jones (politician), Ohio state politician
Doris Jones (archer) (born 1988), Canadian archer
Doris Jones (baseball) (born 1924), member of the All-American Girls Professional Baseball League
Doris W. Jones (1913–2006), founded the Jones-Haywood School of Ballet
Doris Egerton Jones (1889–1973), Australian writer of novels and plays